Old West End Historic District is a national historic district located at Muncie, Delaware County, Indiana. It encompasses 273 contributing buildings in a predominantly residential section of Muncie.  The district largely developed between about 1880 and 1915, and includes notable examples of Late Victorian style architecture.  Notable buildings include Temple Beth-El (1922), First Church of Christ Scientist, Wittmore Apartments (c. 1910), Martin Sisters House (1879-1880), Christian Church / Wesleyan Chapel (1875), Vandercook House (1887), First English Lutheran Church (c. 1891), Muncie Hospital and Invalids Home (1890), and Ira Hunter House (c. 1865).

It was added to the National Register of Historic Places in 1986.

References

Historic districts on the National Register of Historic Places in Indiana
Victorian architecture in Indiana
Historic districts in Muncie, Indiana
National Register of Historic Places in Muncie, Indiana